Celino Salazar Cruz (born July 22, 1977) is a Filipino former professional basketball player. A deadly left-handed shooter, he is best known for his clutch plays. Cruz played eight seasons in the Philippine Basketball Association (PBA). After playing for the Far Eastern University (FEU) Tamaraw in college, Cruz was drafted by the Talk 'N Text Phone Pals nineteenth overall in the 2002 PBA draft. He started his professional career as a rookie with the Shell Turbo Chargers in the 2004–05 PBA season, and later played for the Red Bull Barako before being traded to the Burger King Whoopers and then the Purefoods Tender Juicy Giants.

College
As a freshman, the 1999–2000 season, Cruz was already a starter on a relatively unheralded team. The FEU Tamaraws came into the season and predicted to finish not higher than sixth. But, the Tamaraws won an unexpected UAAP Championship.

Cruz' sophomore season was his breakout year. He led the Tammaraws to their second consecutive UAAP Championship where he was named the Most Outstanding Player of the tournament.

The 2001–2002 season saw Cruz establish himself as one of the top amateur players in the nation. He was the leader of the team and was considered a "coach on the floor." He also received Player of the Year and the Silver Basketball award, and was named to the Mythical Second Team. Cruz then decided to leave college early after his junior year to play in the PBA.

PBA career

Ginebra
Barangay Ginebra traded Paul Artadi, Rafi Reavis, and the rights to 2009 8th pick overall Chris Timberlake for Enrico Villanueva, Rich Alvarez, Celino Cruz, and Paolo Bugia of Purefoods. Burger King acted as the conduit team, trading Pocholo Villanueva to Ginebra and acquiring the rights to 2009 Rookie draft eighteenth pick Orlando Daroya and future picks.

Powerade
At the end of the 2009-10 PBA season, he was released by the Barangay Ginebra Kings. Days after, he was signed by the Powerade Tigers as a free agent. He played a key role on his first year as its starting point guard. Together with Gary David, they became a one-two punch for their offense.

References

External links
Player Profile

1977 births
Filipino men's basketball players
FEU Tamaraws basketball players
Living people
Basketball players from Manila
Magnolia Hotshots players
Point guards
Shell Turbo Chargers players
Barako Bull Energy Boosters players
Barako Bull Energy players
Barangay Ginebra San Miguel players
Powerade Tigers players
Philippines men's national basketball team players
Southeast Asian Games gold medalists for the Philippines
Southeast Asian Games competitors for the Philippines
Southeast Asian Games medalists in basketball
Competitors at the 2003 Southeast Asian Games
TNT Tropang Giga draft picks